William Dennis (21 September 1896 – 1952) was an English footballer. His regular position was at full back. He was born in Mossley, Lancashire. He played for Ashton PSA and Denton before joining the army during World War I during which time he also featured for Birkenhead Comets, Linfield and Tranmere Rovers. Post-war he joined Stalybridge Celtic then was signed by First Division Blackburn Rovers. After a short spell at Ewood Park he re-joined Stalybridge in time to play in the Football League for them. He moved back to the First Division with Manchester United for a short lived spell prior to joining the club with whom he was to have his longest association Chesterfield. He finished his League career with Wigan Borough, before leaving the cash-strapped club for Cheshire League football with first Macclesfield and then Hurst. Aged 37 he joined Mossley as trainer, also making one appearance for his home town club.

References

External links
MUFCInfo.com profile

1896 births
1952 deaths
English footballers
People from Mossley
Association football fullbacks
Denton F.C. players
Stalybridge Celtic F.C. players
Blackburn Rovers F.C. players
Manchester United F.C. players
Chesterfield F.C. players
Wigan Borough F.C. players
Macclesfield Town F.C. players
Ashton United F.C. players
Mossley A.F.C. players
English Football League players
Linfield F.C. wartime guest players
Tranmere Rovers F.C. wartime guest players
British Army personnel of World War I